Sonny Wharton is a British house and techno DJ and record producer. In addition to his solo career, Wharton has launched the record label Whartone Records which features a range of house music DJs and producers.

Biography

Early life
Sonny Wharton was born in mid-Wales, where he was encouraged to explore music by his father Alex Wharton. Alex Wharton produced the Moody Blues' first record "Go Now", scoring a No. 1 UK single and a No. 10 US hit in early 1965.

Wharton's early dance music influences have been cited as Carl Cox, Fatboy Slim and X-Press 2 alongside live acts such as the Prodigy and the Chemical Brothers.

Musical career
Wharton's debut release as a producer came in 2007 with the release of Meat-Cake which saw him collaborate with fellow producer Super Style Deluxe. Meat-Cake was released by The Payback Project label. Following support from the likes of Fatboy Slim, Pete Tong and Roger Sanchez, Wharton has worked on remixes for other artists of varying genres, including Fatboy Slim, Morcheeba, Aloe Blacc, the Temper Trap, Utah Saints and X-Press 2.

Wharton has been releasing singles on the labels Size, Toolroom, Spinnin' and Skint. His collaboration with DJ Chus featuring vocalist El Chino Dreadlion, "Runnin'" topped DMCWorlds magazine's Buzz Chart going straight in at number 1. Wharton's single "Raindance" was championed by Carl Cox and dubbed "Radio 1 Ibiza Track of the Summer" and "Radio 1 Jam of the Week" after winning the public vote on BBC Radio 1's Review show with Edith Bowman. Popular online blog In the Mix also cited Wharton's "Raindance" as number 1 in their article "Ten Massive Tunes That Ruled Ibiza".

As a DJ, Wharton won a DJ Mag mix-tape competition for Renaissance. The award afforded him a chance to present sets in the Ibiza nightclub Amnesia. He was subsequently given a weekly residency at Manumission held at Privilege Ibiza (the world's largest nightclub), where he belonged to the island's large British dance contingent. This initial exposure in the Ibiza scene has led Wharton to play shows at other club venues such as Pacha, Space and Ministry of Sound in London where he supported Armand van Helden for the club's 22nd birthday. Wharton has held international residencies in Stockholm, Barcelona and most notably at Club Octagon in Seoul, recently ranked at #7 in DJ Mags Top 100 Clubs poll. Fatboy Slim endorsed Wharton as his "producer of the year" and included Wharton as a key support act on his sold out 'Eat Sleep Rave Repeat' UK Tour alongside Riva Starr.

A regular on the festival circuit, Wharton has performed at events such as Glastonbury, V Festival, Global Gathering and The Isle of Wight Festival. Wharton's largest event to date was The Berlin Love Parade where he played to a crowd of over a million people.

Wharton has featured on three guest mixes for BBC Radio 1, following the support of Annie Nightingale and his music has been played by Pete Tong, Annie Mac and Danny Howard. His music has featured on Channel 5's The Gadget Show television programme, E4's Misfits and MTV.

Wharton is the UK ambassador for music technology brands Ortofon and Ecler, appearing at international trade shows where he displays the range of products for the companies and features in the companies advertising campaigns in the press and on screen. Wharton is also regularly associated with primary ticket outlet and events guide Skiddle, with exclusive mixes appearing on the website's news section and appearances at events associated with the business (including corporate events organised by and for the business).

Sonny curated and mixed Stress Records recent Club Culture album featuring music from Prospa, Tommy Farrow and Alex Metric.

Alongside Mark Ronson and Eddie Temple Morris, Wharton is an ambassador for the British Tinnitus Association campaign "Plug 'Em" as well as a leading ambassador for the charity group Campaign Against Living Miserably (CALM), who deal with the issues of depression and suicide among young men in the UK.

Whartone records
Whartone records was founded in 2009 and recently celebrated "10 Years of Whartone Records" with a 50-track album release.  As well as being the main hub for Wharton's solo productions, Whartone has released music from Avicii, K-Klass, Will Clarke, Leftwing:Kody and X-Press 2. The label has been supported by the likes of Carl Cox, Pete Tong, Sander Kleinenberg, Sebastian Ingrosso, Mark Knight, Roger Sanchez, and received plays on Radio 1, Kiss FM and Capital FM. In an interview with Wharton he claimed that:

”My vision for the label was to showcase emerging talent in the scene, giving them a platform to develop their sound without the surrounding pressures that can be associated. Whartone Records is a label that is built around great music and great artists and I feel proud to be able to help bring new faces through and help them grow”

Management career
In 2017, Wharton joined London based Your Army Ltd as part of their management department looking after such artists as OC & Verde, Jansons, and Sharam. In 2020, Wharton began managing Chicago based Gene Farris and signed new UK artist Jess Bays.

References

Welsh DJs
Welsh house musicians
Welsh record producers
Living people
Electronic dance music DJs
Year of birth missing (living people)